Jaden Sean Montnor (born 9 August 2002) is a Dutch professional footballer who plays as a forward for Austrian club St. Pölten.

Club career
Having moved to Austria to sign for St. Pölten in 2021, Montnor's career got off to a strong start, scoring 17 goals in 19 appearances in his first season with the Juniors team in 1. Niederösterreichische Landesliga. As a result of this stellar form, he was handed his first team debut, and signed a new contract in June 2022.

Career statistics

Club

Notes

References

2002 births
Living people
Dutch footballers
Association football forwards
2. Liga (Austria) players
FC Utrecht players
AZ Alkmaar players
Almere City FC players
SKN St. Pölten players
Dutch expatriate footballers
Dutch expatriate sportspeople in Austria
Expatriate footballers in Austria